Fugees (sometimes The Fugees) is an American hip hop group formed in 1992. Deriving its name from a shortening of the word "refugees", the group consists of Wyclef Jean, Pras Michel, and Lauryn Hill. The group is often cited as being one of the most significant alternative hip hop groups of the 1990s. The Fugees have won two Grammy Awards and a Brit Award for International Group.

In 1993, the trio signed to Ruffhouse, distributed through Columbia Records. The following year the group released its debut album, Blunted on Reality (1994); the album received mostly favorable reviews, and included the underground Salaam Remi-remixed hits "Nappy Heads" and "Vocab". They followed it up with their second and final studio album, The Score (1996), which was a commercial success, peaking at number one on the US Billboard 200 chart and being certified seven times platinum in the United States. It received universal acclaim, and is considered to be one of the greatest hip hop albums of all time; it included the hit singles "Killing Me Softly", "Ready or Not", and "Fu-Gee-La". 

Afterwards, the Fugees released the single "Rumble in the Jungle" (featuring Busta Rhymes, A Tribe Called Quest & John Forté), which peaked at number three in the UK; and were featured on the Bounty Killer single "Hip-Hopera", which spent several weeks on the Billboard Hot 100 chart. In 1997, the group disbanded so that the members could pursue solo careers. Fugees reunited in 2004, and again in 2021 for reunion tours.

History

Formation and beginnings
Lauryn Hill and Pras first met at Columbia High School, in Maplewood, New Jersey. Pras, Lauryn, and a mutual friend Marcy Harriell formed a musical trio called Tyme; Pras' cousin, Wyclef Jean, joined the line-up and Marcy left soon afterward, in 1990. The moniker Tranzlator Crew refers to the name of their band at the time, which included Johnny Wise on drums, Ti Bass (Jerry Duplessis) on bass guitar, and original DJ Hard Hittin Harry (Harry D’Janite). DJ Leon (Leon Higgins) joined the group in 1994 after Harry left to pursue a career as a publicist. In 1993, after some gigs and recorded demos, the trio signed to Ruffhouse, distributed through Columbia Records. The members then changed the group's name to Fugees, which was purposely taken from a word often used derogatorily to refer to Haitian-Americans (refugee). Refugee Camp, while a name sometimes credited to the trio, also refers to a number of artists affiliated with the members, and particularly Jean.

Blunted on Reality 
The trio soon changed musical direction, and released its first hip-hop LP, Blunted on Reality, under the guidance of Kool and the Gang's producer Ronald Bell. The group wrote and recorded the album in 1992 at the House of Music Studios in West Orange, New Jersey. However, due to a dispute with its record label, the album was not released until February 1, 1994. The Fugees members have subsequently said that they allowed the producers to have too much control over the album's content and form. Although the album did not contain as many lyrics with overtly political messages as songs from their next and better-known album The Score, there were still political intentions. Though Blunted on Reality spawned the three singles "Boof Baf", "Vocab", and "Nappy Heads", they struggled to gain mainstream attention despite earning plaudits for its artistic quality and innovative use of samples. The album's most successful single was a remixed version of the song "Nappy Heads" produced by Salaam Remi. The remix peaked at number 49 on the Billboard Hot 100.

The Score
The musical qualities of the first Fugees record were revisited with their sophomore effort The Score, which was released in February 1996. The Score was Fugees' final record before their disbandment the following year.

The Score became one of the biggest hits of 1996 and one of the best-selling hip-hop albums of all time. The Fugees first gained attention for its cover versions of old favorites, with the group's reinterpretations of "No Woman No Cry" by Bob Marley & the Wailers and "Killing Me Softly with His Song" (first recorded by Lori Lieberman in 1971, remade by Roberta Flack in 1973), the latter being their biggest hit.

The album also included a re-interpretation of The Delfonics' "Ready or Not Here I Come (Can't Hide From Love)" in their hit single, "Ready or Not", which featured a prominent sample of Enya's "Boadicea" without the singer's permission. This prompted a lawsuit resulting in a settlement where Enya was given credit and royalties for her sample. The group members have continuously thanked and praised Enya for her deep understanding of the situation, for example in the liner notes of The Score.

The Fugees won two 1997 Grammy Awards with The Score (Best Rap Album) and "Killing Me Softly" (Best R&B Vocal Performance by a Duo or Group).

They produced remixes of Michael Jackson's "Blood on the Dance Floor" and "2 Bad".

Later career
In 1997, the Fugees were featured on the song "Hip-Hopera" by Bounty Killer, which spent five weeks on the Billboard Hot 100 chart, while peaking at number 81. The group also recorded the song "Rumble in the Jungle" featuring Busta Rhymes, A Tribe Called Quest & John Forté, for the 1996 documentary When We Were Kings.

Later that year, the Fugees all began solo projects: Hill began writing and producing for a number of artists (including Whitney Houston, Aretha Franklin and Mary J. Blige) and started work on her critically acclaimed The Miseducation of Lauryn Hill; Jean also began producing for a number of artists (including Canibus, Destiny's Child and Carlos Santana) and released his debut album Wyclef Jean Presents The Carnival; Pras, with Mýa and Ol' Dirty Bastard, recorded the single "Ghetto Supastar (That Is What You Are)" for the soundtrack to the film Bulworth. In 1998, they reunited to shoot a music video for the song "Just Happy to Be Me" which appeared in the Sesame Street special Elmopalooza, and also on the Grammy Award-winning soundtrack album.

The three Fugees reunited and performed on September 18, 2004, at the concert in Bedford-Stuyvesant, Brooklyn featured in the film Dave Chappelle's Block Party (2004), headlining a star-studded bill that included Kanye West, Mos Def, Jill Scott, Erykah Badu, The Roots, Talib Kweli, Common, Big Daddy Kane, Dead Prez, Cody ChesnuTT and John Legend. Their performance received several positive reviews, many of which praised Hill's near a cappella rendition of "Killing Me Softly".

The Fugees made their first televised appearance in almost ten years at BET's 2005 Music Awards on June 28, opening the show with a twelve-minute set. With a new album announced to be in the works, their final track, "Take It Easy", was leaked online and eventually released as an Internet single on September 27, 2005. It peaked at number 40 on the Billboard R&B Chart.

In November 2005, Fugees embarked on a European tour – the members' first together since 1997 – from 30 November to 20 December, playing in Finland, Austria, Norway, Germany, Italy, France, the United Kingdom, Belgium, Denmark, Sweden, Switzerland and Slovakia. The group had been scheduled to play at the Hammersmith Apollo on November 25, 2005; however, it was forced to move the gig to December due to production issues. The tour received mixed reviews. On February 6, 2006, the group reunited for a free show in Hollywood, with tickets given away to about 8,000 fans by local radio stations. Later that month, a new track called "Foxy" was leaked, a song dubbed the "real return of the Fugees" by several online music blogs.

However, following the reunion tour, the album that was said to be in the works did not materialize and was postponed indefinitely, as relationships between band members apparently deteriorated. During the recording of the album, the group was plagued with creative differences. They recorded a song titled "Lips Don't Lie", but Hill did not like the song and, after some disagreements over it, the group disbanded again. The song was ultimately given to singer Shakira with featured vocals by Jean and after the title was changed to "Hips Don't Lie", the song was released a single and became a global hit. In August 2007, a year after the group's second disbandment, Pras stated, "Before I work with Lauryn Hill again, you will have a better chance of seeing Osama Bin Laden and [George W.] Bush in Starbucks having a latte, discussing foreign policies, before there will be a Fugees reunion". Meanwhile, in September 2007, an equally outspoken Wyclef told Blues & Soul: "I feel the first issue that needs to be addressed is that Lauryn needs help... In my personal opinion, those Fugees reunion shows shouldn't have been done, because we wasn't ready. I really felt we shoulda first all gone into a room with Lauryn and a psychiatrist... But, you know, I do believe Lauryn can get help. And, once she does work things out, hopefully a proper and enduring Fugees reunion will happen." On July 15, 2017, an old song by the Fugees was leaked on Hot 97 radio; this led to reports that the group was reforming, which were later denied by group members on Twitter.

After the group split, Wyclef Jean co-founded and headed the Yele Haiti Foundation, a non-profit organization "focusing on emergency relief, employment, youth development and education, and tree planting and agriculture" in Haiti. Pras Michel starred in a documentary about homelessness in Los Angeles and remained outspoken about Haitian politics. Lauryn Hill continued recording and performing socially conscious music and went on to advocate for female empowerment especially within the music industry. Fugees also turned their recording studio, The Booga Basement, into a transitional house for young Haitian refugees immigrating to the United States.

In September 2021, Fugees announced a reunion tour to celebrate 25 years of their album, The Score. On Friday, October 29, 2021, Fugees announced that their reunion tour dates were postponed to early 2022. However, on January 21, 2022, Fugees released a statement saying they would not be going on tour due to the COVID-19 pandemic.

Legacy
Fugees has often been referred to as one of the most influential and significant groups of the 1990s, with Billboard stating "their influence on modern hip-hop and R&B music is undeniable". They are often considered to be one of the definitive alternative hip hop acts, being one of the first alternative hip hop acts to break into the mainstream. The group has sold over twenty-two million records worldwide, and are one of the biggest-selling hip hop groups of all time. According to Forbes, their success helped establish Ruffhouse Records as a major record label. Consequence noted Fugees for putting Haiti on the hip hop map.

While Matthew Ismael Ruiz of Pitchfork, noted the group for removing negative connotations of Haitian immigration and the word 'Refugee', stating that "The Fugees managed to diversify the voice of the ghetto, one often depicted in a single dimension. They reclaimed pride for Haitians worldwide, a heritage maligned for its postcolonial poverty and strife but still remembered as the setting for the new world’s first successful revolt of enslaved people against their oppressors. Their sound was multifaceted because they were, too, their music diverse, just like the Black experience." The Ringer noted that Fugees delivered political messages and brought hip hop to the mainstream in their music by blending elements of pop, soul, dancehall and Caribbean music, making it more palpable for a wider audience without making the message dense, stating "Fugees disguised resistance as art, the same way that enslaved Africans once hid martial arts from their colonial masters by pretending that they were a dance."

Writing for The Recording Academy, music journalist Kathy Iandoli wrote about the impact of the group on the hip hop genre stating: "As hip-hop's East and West Coasts continued their tussle, their lighter-hearted approach to socially conscious rap curtailed any overarching assumptions that hip-hop was going down a "bad road". Plus, they had Lauryn Hill, who doubled as a songbird and lyrical spitfire. Together, by juxtaposing live instrumentation, soulful melodies and abstract bars, The Fugees gave hip-hop a renewed spirit and propelled it to a different kind of mainstream".Multiple recording artists have cited The Fugees as an influence, including Bono, Drake, Kanye West, Akon, Black Eyed Peas, Young Thug, Bridgit Mendler, Sean Kingston, Ava Max, Doja Cat, Bastille, and Diplo.

The impact of the Fugees has been compared to that of the Beatles, with U2's Bono calling them hip hop's version of the Beatles. Daryl McIntosh of Albumism compared the public response from the group's sophomore album, The Score to that of Beatlemania, referring to it as "Fugee-mania". In 2007, MTV ranked it the ninth-greatest hip-hop group of all time. In 2012, BET placed the group on its list of 'Hip Hop's Greatest Trios'. 

Former United States President Barack Obama, named the Fugees single "Ready or Not" his favorite song ever. In 2012, they were inducted into the N.J. Pop & Rock Hall. A photograph of the group taken in 1994, has been stored and collected by the Smithsonian National Museum of African American History and Culture. In 2020, The Score ranked 134th on the revised version of Rolling Stone's 500 Greatest Albums of All Time. The following year, their version of "Killing Me Softly" was placed on the revised version of Rolling Stone's 500 Greatest Songs of All Time.

Discography

 Blunted on Reality (1994)
 The Score (1996)

References

External links
Official Fugees Website

 
American hip hop groups
Brit Award winners
Grammy Award winners for rap music
Five percenters
Musical groups disestablished in 1997
Musical groups established in 1994
Musical groups from New Jersey
Musical groups reestablished in 2004
Musical groups disestablished in 2006
Musical groups reestablished in 2021
American soul musical groups
American contemporary R&B musical groups
American reggae musical groups
Wyclef Jean
Lauryn Hill
1994 establishments in New Jersey
MTV Europe Music Award winners